Owen Clive Crossman (14 November 1903 – c. 1963) was a rugby union player who represented Australia.

Crossman, a wing, was born in Glen Innes, New South Wales and claimed a total of 15 international rugby caps for Australia.

References

Australian rugby union players
Australia international rugby union players
1903 births
1963 deaths
Rugby union players from New South Wales
Rugby union wings